State Route 115 (SR-115) is a state highway in the U.S. state of Utah, connecting Payson and Spanish Fork by way of Benjamin in southwestern Utah County. The road was placed under state jurisdiction in the 1930s.

Route description
State Route 115 begins on Main Street at the intersection of 100 North (SR-198) in Payson. Heading north, the route exits the town and intersects Interstate 15/U.S. Route 6 (I-15/US-6) within . Past I-15/US-6, the road exits the street grid of Payson and enters that of Utah County's, becoming 3200 West. The highway enters the rural community of Benjamin and, upon reaching SR-147, turns west on 7300 South. The road exits the community, passes under I-15/US-6, and turns north on 1550 West. The road turns northwest to parallel I-15/US-6 and then turns west onto 6800 West. Entering Spanish Fork as 100 South, the road terminates at Main Street (SR-156).

History
State Route 115 was established by the legislature in 1931 as running "from Spanish Fork westerly via Benjamin to Payson". The route has not been changed since then.

Major intersections

References

115
 115
Spanish Fork, Utah